Raymond Frimpong Owusu (born 20 April 2002) is a Ghanaian professional footballer who plays as a forward for Süper Lig club İstanbulspor.

Club career
In March 2021, Owusu moved to Ukrainian club Zorya Luhansk. In the 2022 Russian invasion of Ukraine, Owusu fled the country and began training with Borussia Dortmund.

Owusu joined recently promoted Süper Lig club İstanbulspor on 17 August 2022, signing a one-year contract. He made his competitive debut for the club on 17 September, replacing Jetmir Topalli in the 60th minute of a 2–2 league draw against Beşiktaş.

References

External links
 Statistics at UAF website (Ukr)
 

2002 births
Living people
Ghanaian footballers
Association football forwards
FC Zorya Luhansk players
İstanbulspor footballers
Ghanaian expatriate footballers
Ukrainian Premier League players
Süper Lig players
Expatriate footballers in Ukraine
Ghanaian expatriate sportspeople in Ukraine
Expatriate footballers in Turkey
Ghanaian expatriate sportspeople in Turkey